Kheyrabad-e Naser (also Romanized as Kheyrābād-e Naāṣer; also known as Khairābād and Kheyrābād) is a village in Lishtar Rural District, in the Central District of Gachsaran County, Kohgiluyeh and Boyer-Ahmad Province, Iran. At the 2006 census, its population was 296, in 56 families.

References 

Populated places in Gachsaran County